Eddy Ghossein (born 7 August 1984) is a Lebanese musician best known as the guitarist for The Wanton Bishops, a blues rock band from Beirut, Lebanon. As a member of the band, Ghossein has recorded one studio album with his bandmate Nader Mansour called "Sleep with the Lights On".

References

1984 births
Living people
Lebanese rock musicians
Rock guitarists
21st-century guitarists